The 2020–21 Mid-American Conference men's basketball season began with practices in October 2020, followed by the start of the 2020–21 NCAA Division I men's basketball season in November. Conference play began in January 2021 and concluded in March 2021. In  a season limited due to the ongoing COVID-19 pandemic, Toledo won the regular season title with a conference record of 15-4. Ohio won the MAC tournament and represented the MAC in the NCAA tournament where they defeated No. 4-seeded Virginia in the first round before falling to No. 5-seeded Creighton in the second round. Toledo went to the NIT where they lost to Richmond in the first round.

Preseason awards
The preseason coaches' poll and league awards were announced by the league office on November 19, 2020.

Preseason men's basketball coaches poll
(First place votes in parenthesis)
 Bowling Green (8) 132
 Ohio (1) 117
 Akron (2) 115
 Buffalo 109
 Ball State 104
 Toledo (1) 93
 Kent State 65
 Eastern Michigan 57
 Miami 48
 Northern Illinois 43
 Central Michigan 40
 Western Michigan 13
MAC tournament champions: Bowling Green (4), Akron (2), Ball State (1), Buffalo (1), Eastern Michigan (1), Kent State (1), Miami (1), Toledo (1)

Honors

Conference matrix

All-MAC awards

Mid-American men's basketball weekly awards

Postseason

Mid–American tournament

NCAA tournament

Postseason awards

Coach of the Year: Tod Kowalczyk, Toledo
Player of the Year: Marreon Jackson, Toledo
Freshman of the Year: Ryan Rollins, Toledo
Defensive Player of the Year: Josh Mballa, Buffalo
Sixth Man of the Year: Trey Diggs, Bowling Green

Honors

See also
 2020–21 Mid-American Conference women's basketball season

References